Manj District is in Lordegan County, Chaharmahal and Bakhtiari province, Iran. At the 2006 census, its population was 17,232 in 3,266 households. The following census in 2011 counted 18,032 people in 3,914 households. At the latest census in 2016, the district had 17,998 inhabitants living in 4,626 households.

References 

Lordegan County

Districts of Chaharmahal and Bakhtiari Province

Populated places in Chaharmahal and Bakhtiari Province

Populated places in Lordegan County